L'Art de varier ("The Art of Varying"), Op. 57, is a set of variations for piano composed by Anton Reicha. It was composed around 1803–4 and published in Leipzig. The set comprises a theme in F major and 57 variations, ranging from very easy to extremely virtuosic pieces.

The work was composed for, and dedicated to, Prince Louis Ferdinand of Prussia, a gifted musician and composer to whom Beethoven dedicated his Third Piano Concerto. Reicha's behaviour is slightly surprising, given that a few years before L'art de varier, in 1801, he rejected an invitation to become Louis Ferdinand's Kapellmeister and teacher.

References
 Peter Eliot Stone. "Reicha, Antoine", Grove Music Online, ed. L. Macy, grovemusic.com (subscription access).

External links
 

Compositions by Anton Reicha
Art
Art